Howard Louis Ballard (born November 3, 1963) is a former American football offensive tackle in the National Football League (NFL) for the Buffalo Bills and Seattle Seahawks. Nicknamed "House", for his sturdy build, he played in four Super Bowls and was selected to two Pro Bowls while a member of the Bills. He played college football at Alabama A&M University.

After breaking his leg in a game, which ended his career, Ballard worked as a sheriff's deputy in Clay County, Alabama. He eventually returned to school to finish his degree, and started coaching high school football in Pike County, Alabama.

References

1963 births
Living people
People from Ashland, Alabama
American football offensive tackles
Alabama A&M Bulldogs football players
Buffalo Bills players
Seattle Seahawks players
American Conference Pro Bowl players
Ed Block Courage Award recipients